CPH:DOX is the official name for the Copenhagen International Documentary Film Festival, an international documentary film festival established in 2003 and held annually in Copenhagen, Denmark. CPH:DOX has since grown to become one of the largest documentary film festivals in Europe with 114,408 admissions in 2019.

Details 
CPH:DOX is devoted to supporting independent and innovative film and to present contemporary non-fiction, art cinema and experimental film. The festival has been recognized for its sharp and daring programme profile with a special focus on exploring the hybrid field between documentary practice and various type of staging – sometimes to controversial effect, as when Harmony Korine won the CPH:DOX Award in 2009 for his film Trash Humpers.

Besides its seven international competitions, the festival presents parallel curated and guest curated sections. In recent years, artists and filmmakers such as The xx, Anohni, Harmony Korine, Animal Collective, Nan Goldin, Douglas Gordon, Ben Rivers & Ben Russell, Ai Weiwei, The Yes Men, Olafur Eliasson and Naomi Klein & Avi Lewis have curated film programmes exclusively for CPH:DOX. Parallel to this the festival has been presenting retrospective programmes with among others Phillippe Grandrieux, Nathalie Djurberg, Vincent Moon, Charles Atlas, and James Benning & Sadie Benning, as well as installations and exhibitions film and video artists, among them Michelangelo Frammartino, Keren Cytter and Charles Atlas.

The festival hosts seminars, debates and events as well as the curated concert series Audio:Visuals, where bands and artists such as Animal Collective, The Knife, John Maus, Nan Goldin & Genesis P-Orridge, Patti Smith, Beach House have been performing to original work created for the occasion by visual artists.

CPH:DOX also presents a number of other initiatives parallel to the festival itself. The industry platform CPH:Forum, with the attached CPH:Market for buyers and programmers, is a financing and co-production forum as well as a networking facility which takes place for three days during the festival. In 2011, the related ART:FILM branch was launched with the aim to facilitate the development and actual production of artists' films in the feature length format. CPH:DOX runs the five-day CPH:Conference as well as the experimental educational course DOX:Academy for students, both of which take place during the festival.

In 2009, the festival launched the international talent development and film production workshop CPH:LAB (formerly known as DOX:LAB) where around 20 filmmakers are invited each year to develop and direct a film in teams of two. CPH:LAB has been a great success with films premiering and winning prizes at film festivals such as Venice, the Berlinale, Rotterdam, and elsewhere.

Following the 2015 edition of CPH:DOX, the festival announced that it would change its dates from November to March, and the first of the new spring editions of the festival was held from March 16–26, 2017, with the centrally located Kunsthal Charlottenborg as the new festival center.

CPH: DOX is part of the Doc Alliance – a creative partnership between 7 key European documentary film festivals.

Awards 
Juries hand out prizes in seven international competition programmes:
 The CPH:DOX Award for international documentary features
 The NEW:VISION Award for experimental and artists' film
 The F:ACT Award for films in the field between investigative journalism and documentary
 The NORDIC:DOX Award for Nordic documentaries and artists' films
 The NEXT:WAVE Award for emerging filmmakers and artists
 The Politiken:Danish:Dox Award awarded by a jury of film critics from the Danish newspaper Politiken
 The Doc Alliance Award is handed out in collaboration between CPH:DOX and six other European documentary film festivals to one of the seven films nominated by the participating festivals.

Award winners

CPH:DOX Award

2003 CPH:DOX

2004 CPH:DOX

2005 CPH:DOX

2006 CPH:DOX

2007 CPH:DOX

2008 CPH:DOX

2009 CPH:DOX

2010 CPH:DOX

2011 CPH:DOX

2012 CPH:DOX

2013 CPH:DOX

2014 CPH:DOX

2015 CPH:DOX

2017 CPH:DOX

2018 CPH:DOX

2019 CPH:DOX

2020 CPH:DOX

2021 CPH:DOX

References

External links 
 

Bodil Special Award recipients
Documentary film festivals
Festivals in Copenhagen
Film festivals in Denmark
Film festivals established in 2003
2003 establishments in Denmark